Łukaszewicz is a Polish surname. It comes from the given name Łukasz (Lucas). It is most frequent in north-eastern Poland. 
Archaic feminine forms: Łukaszewiczówna (unmarried) and Łukaszewiczówa (married).

Related  surnames: Łukasiewicz and Lukashevich.

People 
 Jolanta Łukaszewicz (born 1966) is a Polish sprint canoer
 Józef Łukaszewicz (1863–1928) was a Polish scientist and revolutionary
 Julian Łukaszewicz (1904-1982), Polish athlete
 Olgierd Łukaszewicz (born 1946) is a Polish film actor
 Wacław Łukaszewicz (1927–2014), Polish scout leader
 Bronisława Łukaszewicz (1885-1962) was a Polish-Lithuanian painter
 Ignacy Łukasiewicz (1822 – 1882) was a Polish pharmacist, engineer, businessman, inventor, and philanthropist. Inventor of parafin distillation and the parafin lamp

References 

Polish-language surnames
Patronymic surnames
Surnames from given names